Türk Kadınlar Birliği (Turkish Women's Union) was a women's organization in Turkey, founded in 1924.  It was the main women's suffrage organization in Turkey. It played a significant part in the history of the Turkish women's movement.

History
In 1923, after the foundation of the Turkish Republic, the Women's People Party was founded by Nezihe Muhiddin. However, the party could not be registered, because women's suffrage had not been provided for in the new state. In response, Nezihe Muhiddin founded the Türk Kadınlar Birliği to work for the introduction of women's suffrage.

President Mustafa Kemal Atatürk was willing to meet most of the demands of the Turkish women's movement, and did so with three major reforms: by inducting women in the state education system along with men; by introducing the Swiss Civil Code of 1926, giving Turkish women the same rights as Swiss women; and finally by introducing women's suffrage in 1935.

The organization hosted the Twelfth Conference of the International Woman Suffrage Alliance in Istanbul in 1935. That same year, Mustafa Kemal Atatürk introduced women's suffrage. Their goal having been achieved, the President of the organization, Latife Bekir dissolved the organization that same year. Most of the women elected to Parliament in 1935 were members of the Türk Kadınlar Birliği.

After the dissolution of the Turkish Women's Union, the Turkish women's movement merged with the Secular Kemal's party. And independent Turkish women's movement did not emerge until the 1980s.

References 

 Suad Joseph, Afsāna Naǧmābādī:  Encyclopedia of Women and Islamic Cultures: Family, Law and Politics
 ABSTRACT THE OTTOMAN WOMEN’S MOVEMENT: WOMEN’S PRESS, JOURNALS, MAGAZINES AND NEWSPAPERS FROM 1875 TO 1923 By Vuslat Devrim Altınöz 
 Ufuk Üniversitesi Sosyal Bilimler Enstitüsü Dergisi Yıl:9 Sayı:17 (2020)

1920s establishments in Turkey
Feminism and history
Feminist organizations in Turkey
Organizations established in 1924
Social history of Turkey
Voter rights and suffrage organizations
Women's suffrage in Turkey